Seronera Airstrip  is the primary airstrip in the Serengeti National Park.

Airlines and destinations

Gallery

See also

 List of airports in Tanzania
 Transport in Tanzania

References

External links

Tanzania Airports Authority
OurAirports - Seronera
OpenStreetMap - Seronera
 

Airstrips in Tanzania
Buildings and structures in the Mara Region